Rudamina may refer to:
Rudamina (Vilnius)
Rudamina (Lazdijai)